Ram Records could refer to two different record labels:
 RAM Records, a British drum and bass label
 Ram Records (US), a Shreveport, Louisiana-based label